Kendall Coyne Schofield (born May 25, 1992) is an American professional ice hockey player who is currently a member of the United States women's national ice hockey team. With the national team, she has won six gold medals at the IIHF World Women's Championships and the gold medal at the 2018 Winter Olympics. In 2016, she was the winner of the Patty Kazmaier Memorial Award. In January 2017, Coyne was recognized as the recipient of the NCAA Today's Top 10 Award.

She has also been a color commentator for the San Jose Sharks. In 2020, she was hired by the Chicago Blackhawks as a player development coach for their American Hockey League affiliate, the Rockford IceHogs.

Early life and education
Coyne was born in Palos Heights, Illinois to John and Ahlise Coyne. She has two brothers and a sister. Her oldest brother Kevin Coyne played Division III. Her younger brother Jake is a member of the United States Army. Her younger sister, Bailey, is a forward for the Lindenwood Women's Ice Hockey Team  

From 2006 to 2010, Coyne attended Sandburg High School and later attended the prep school, the Berkshire School, in Sheffield, Massachusetts for the academic year 2010 to 2011. In December 2015, she graduated from Northeastern University in Boston with a B.A. in communication studies. In 2017, she graduated with an M.S. summa cum laude in corporate and organizational communications at Northeastern University.

Playing career

Amateur
During the 2009–10 season, Coyne scored 53 goals and registered 34 assists in 46 games with the Chicago Mission Under 19 girls' team. Coyne participated in three seasons with the Mission and had 254 points in 157 games. In addition, she played in two national championship games with the Mission and won one title. Coyne attended the Berkshire School for the 2010–2011 season, totaling 77 points on 55 goals and 22 assists in 25 games. She was named the New England Prep School Player of the Year.

On April 28, 2011, it was announced that Coyne committed to the Northeastern Huskies women's ice hockey program. In her senior year, Coyne was awarded the Patty Kazmaier Award as the top female college ice hockey player in the United States.

USA Hockey
On January 10, 2009, in Fussen, Germany, Coyne scored the game-winning goal in overtime for the US in the gold medal game of the 2009 IIHF Under 19 championships. In August 2009, Coyne was the youngest player (at 17 years old) at the USA Hockey women's national festival in Blaine, Minnesota. The festival was the selection camp for the senior national team (that would constitute players for the 2010 Olympic team), and Coyne was one of 41 players that were invited. In the gold medal game of the 2010 Four Nations Cup, Coyne scored for the United States. After the 2010 Four Nations Cup, Coyne had 36 career points (24 goals, 12 assists) in 27 games with the U.S. national team.

On January 28, 2011, it was announced that Coyne was named to the preliminary roster for the U.S. Women's National Team. From April 4 to 12, 2011, she was one of 30 players who took part in a selection/training camp. She was named to the final roster that participated at the 2011 IIHF Women's World Championship.

On January 2, 2022, she was named to Team USA's roster to represent the United States at the 2022 Winter Olympics.

Professional

In the 2015 NWHL Draft, she was selected third overall by the Boston Pride. In July 2016, Coyne signed with the independent Minnesota Whitecaps. Heading into the 2018–19 Minnesota Whitecaps season, Coyne re-signed with the club in their first season as members of the National Women's Hockey League. Coyne was named to Team Szabados for the 2019 NWHL All-Star Weekend on December 5, 2018.

On July 11, 2018, Coyne became the first woman to play in the Chicago Pro Hockey League at MB Arena, a league that features 80 professional players and 80 amateurs.

On January 25, 2019, Coyne was named a replacement for Colorado Avalanche forward Nathan MacKinnon at the 2019 NHL All-Star Skills fastest-skater challenge as part of the 2019 NHL All-Star weekend. Although she was originally going to demonstrate the challenges, Coyne became the first woman to compete in an NHL All-Stars skills competition. Coyne had a time of 14.326 seconds, which placed her seventh out of eight skaters, which was comparable to the rest of the eight-person field; Connor McDavid won the competition with a time of 13.378 seconds. She then served as a broadcasting analyst during the Pittsburgh Penguins and Tampa Bay Lightning game on Wednesday Night Hockey.

On January 15, 2020, Coyne was one of ten players named to the US roster for the Elite Women's 3 on 3 at the 2020 NHL All-Star Weekend in St. Louis.

International competition

IIHF World Women's Championships
Coyne has competed in seven IIHF World Women's Championships, winning gold medals in 2011, 2013, 2015, 2016, 2017, and 2019, and a silver medal in 2012.
Coyne competed in three IIHF U18 World Women's Championships, winning gold medals in 2008 and 2009 and silver in 2010. Coyne is the all-time leading scorer in tournament history with 33 points (22g 11a) in 15 games
 2011: Zurich and Winterthur, Switzerland – gold medal
 Tied for second on the team in goals scored with four and third on the team in plus/minus rating (+9)
 2012: Burlington, Vermont – silver medal
 Named U.S. Player of the Game in the gold-medal game (April 14); was second overall in the tournament in plus/minus rating (+10)
 2013: Ottawa, Ontario – gold medal
 Tied for sixth overall with four assists
 2015: Malmo, Sweden – gold medal
 Tied for tournament lead with plus-8 rating
 2016: Kamloops, British Columbia – gold medal
 2017: Plymouth, Michigan – gold medal Tied for tournament lead with 12 points and five goals. Named U.S. Player of the Game in a preliminary-round matchup against Russia and the semifinals versus Germany. Also named one of the Top Three U.S. Players of the Tournament
 2019: Espoo, Finland Served as team captain. Finished with nine points (5g 4a) in five games and a plus eleven rating. Named to the Media All-Star Team along with teammates Hilary Knight and Cayla Barnes. Won the Directorate Award as top forward in the tournament. Named the Bob Allen Women’s Player of the Year 
 Tied for tournament lead with 12 points and five goals. 
 Named U.S. Player of the Game in a preliminary-round matchup against Russia and the semi-finals versus Germany. Also named one of the top three U.S. players of the tournament

Olympic Winter Games
Coyne represented the U.S. at the Sochi 2014 Olympic Winter Games, where she won a silver medal, and at the PyeongChang 2018 Olympic Winter Games, where she won a gold medal. In Sochi 2014, Team USA lost to Canada in the gold medal game. Coyne was the leading scorer for Team USA, with 6 points on 2 goals and 4 assists.
 2014: Sochi, Russia – silver medal
 Skated in five games, recording two goals and four assists
 2018: PyeongChang, South Korea – gold medal
 Recorded two goals and an assist in five games
 Led team in shots on goal with 21

Awards and honors
 2012–13: American Hockey Coaches Association, CCM Hockey Women's Division I, All Americans, Second Team
 2015: American Hockey Coaches Association, CCM Hockey Women's Division I All-Americans, Second Team
 2016: Patty Kazmaier Award CCM Hockey Women's Division I, All Americans
 2017: NCAA, Today's Top 10 Award Tied for tournament lead with 12 points and five goals. Named U.S. Player of the Game in a preliminary-round matchup against Russia and the semifinals versus Germany. Also named one of the Top Three U.S. Players of the Tournament

Hockey East
Hockey East Rookie of the Week (Week of October 31, 2011)
Hockey East Rookie of the Week (Week of November 28, 2011)
Hockey East Player of the Month (Month of November 2011)
Hockey East Rookie of the Week (Week of January 23, 2012)
Hockey East Player of the Month (Month of January 2012)
2014–15 Hockey East First Team All-Star

USA Hockey
2011 U.S. Player of the Game, November 12, 2011, vs. Finland, 2011 4 Nations Cup
 2017 Tied for tournament lead with 12 points and five goals. Named U.S. Player of the Game in a preliminary-round matchup against Russia and the semifinals versus Germany. Also named one of the Top Three U.S. Players of the Tournament
 2019 Served as team captain. Finished with nine points (5g 4a) in five games and a plus eleven rating. Named to the Media All-Star Team along with teammates Hilary Knight and Cayla Barnes. Won the Directorate Award as top forward in the tournament. Named the Bob Allen Women’s Player of the Year

NWHL
Isobel Cup Champion (2019)

Books
Coyne wrote an autobiography, As Fast As Her: Dream Big, Break Barriers, Achieve Success, co-written with Estelle Laure, published in January 2022.

Personal life
Coyne is married to NFL player Michael Schofield of the Chicago Bears. They attended the same high school in Orland Park, but did not start to date until they were both college-age and met at a local gym. They wed in July 2018.

On March 1, 2021, the Chicago Red Stars of the National Women's Soccer League announced that Coyne and her spouse Michael Schofield had joined the women's soccer team's ownership group.

References

External links

Kendall Coyne at Team USA

1992 births
American Ninja Warrior contestants
American women's ice hockey forwards
Ice hockey players from Illinois
Ice hockey players at the 2014 Winter Olympics
Ice hockey players at the 2018 Winter Olympics
Ice hockey players at the 2022 Winter Olympics
Living people
Medalists at the 2014 Winter Olympics
Medalists at the 2018 Winter Olympics
Medalists at the 2022 Winter Olympics
Northeastern Huskies women's ice hockey players
Olympic gold medalists for the United States in ice hockey
Olympic silver medalists for the United States in ice hockey
Patty Kazmaier Award winners
Sportspeople from Cook County, Illinois
Professional Women's Hockey Players Association players
Minnesota Whitecaps players
Berkshire School alumni
Isobel Cup champions
Chicago Red Stars owners